Night of the Stormcrow is a Big Finish Productions audiobook based on the long-running British science fiction television series Doctor Who.  It is free to subscribers and released with 1001 Nights.

Plot
A mountainside observatory searches the skies for a vast and deadly creature.

Cast
Fourth Doctor – Tom Baker
Leela – Louise Jameson
Peggy Brooks – Chase Masterson
Professor Gesima Cazalet – Ann Bell
Trevor Gale – Jonathan Forbes
Erica MacMillan – Mandi Symonds

References

External links
 Big Finish Productions

2012 audio plays
Fourth Doctor audio plays
Audio plays by Marc Platt